The Severn Bridge is a motorway suspension bridge that spans the River Severn between South Gloucestershire in England and Monmouthshire in South East Wales. It is the original Severn road crossing between England and Wales, and took three and a half years to build, at a cost of £8 million. It replaced the 137-year-old Aust Ferry.

The bridge was opened in 1966 by Queen Elizabeth II. For thirty years, the bridge carried the M4 motorway. It was granted Grade I listed status in 1999.

Following the completion of the Prince of Wales Bridge, the section of motorway from Olveston in England to Magor in Wales was designated the M48.

History

The first proposal for a bridge across the Severn, approximately in the same location as that eventually constructed, was in 1824 by Thomas Telford, who had been asked to advise on how to improve mail coach services between London and Wales. No action was taken, and over the next few decades the railways became the dominant mode of long-distance travel, with the Severn Railway Bridge at Sharpness being opened in 1879 and the main line Severn Tunnel in 1886.

The growth of road traffic in the early 20th century led to further calls for improvements, and in the early 1920s Chepstow Urban District Council convened a meeting of neighbouring local authorities to consider a Severn crossing to ease congestion and delays on the A48 passing through the town. In 1935 Gloucestershire and Monmouthshire County Councils jointly promoted a Parliamentary Bill to obtain powers to build the bridge over the estuary, with 75% of costs to be met by the Ministry of Transport from the Road Fund. The bill was rejected by Parliament after opposition from the Great Western Railway Company.

After the Second World War, plans began to be made for a nationally funded network of trunk roads, including a Severn Bridge, for which the contract was awarded to Mott, Hay and Anderson, with Freeman Fox and Partners. The public inquiry into the scheme was held on 24 September 1946 at Bristol University. Because Government funding was prioritised for the similar Forth Road Bridge (opened in 1964), construction of the Severn Bridge was not started until 1961: the UK government announced in 1962 that construction costs would be recovered by a toll of 2s 6d (£0.125) on all vehicle crossings, though walking or cycling across the bridge would be charge-free. The substructure was completed by contractors John Howard and Co in 1963. The superstructure contract was awarded to Associated Bridge Builders Ltd (a joint venture of Sir William Arrol & Co., Cleveland Bridge & Engineering Company and Dorman Long) in 1963, and completed in 1966.

The bridge has been featured in several promotions.

In January 1977, it was announced that bridge traffic would be restricted to a single lane in each direction following the discovery of several weaknesses in the ten-year-old structure. The lane closures would last for several months.

The Severn Bridge crossing was strengthened and resurfaced in the late 1980s as the weight of traffic grew. The work included the strengthening of the Severn Bridge towers and deck, an extension to the Wye Bridge towers and the replacement of the original single stays with two stays. The open structure of the new stays is designed to facilitate maintenance. Most of the strengthening work was inside the deck box and towers and so is not visible. Design of the strengthening was by Flint & Neill.

During its 40th year of operation in 2006, the bridge was inspected to check for corrosion of the suspension cables. According to the Highways Agency, the inspection concluded that the bridge needed restrictions on heavy goods vehicles. Such vehicles are now restricted to one lane on the bridge, with weight restriction signs in place. A system of rubber casing on the cables with dry air circulation, as used on the Forth Road Bridge, was installed in 2007–2009 in a move to halt the progress of the corrosion.

The bridge is also home to Severn Bridge parkrun, one of the many free, weekly 5k runs held in both the UK and internationally.

In October 2021, the Welsh Government announced it is considering reclassifying the M48 into an A-road. This is due to lower amounts of traffic on the bridge and M48, following the opening of the Prince of Wales bridge, and the high costs to improve the M48 to motorway standards for the decreased amounts of traffic it handles. Reclassification requires approval from both the Welsh Government and Secretary of State for Wales, with the Department for Transport stating they have no plans to reclassify the M48 in England.

Component structures 
The Severn Bridge crossing consists of four structures, which, in order from England to Wales, are: the Aust Viaduct, Severn Bridge, Beachley Viaduct and Wye Bridge. In 1998 the Severn Bridge and Aust Viaduct were given Grade I listed status, and the Beachley Viaduct (eastern/English end) of the Wye Bridge and the western/Welsh end of the Wye Bridge received Grade II listed status.

Aust Viaduct 
The  Aust Viaduct is a twin box girder structure with a concrete deck, which carries the roadway from the top of Aust Cliff to the first gravity anchorage of the old Severn Bridge. The roadway is then carried over the top of the concrete anchorage to the Severn Bridge.

Severn Bridge 

The Severn Bridge is located close to the former Aust Ferry. The bridge is a suspension bridge of conventional design, with the deck supported by two main cables slung between two steel towers. The main cables are each made up of 8,322 individual  wires. An unusual feature of the suspension cables carrying the deck is that they are not vertical, as for most suspension bridges, but rather arranged in a zig-zag fashion, with adjacent mounts closely spaced. The triangulation this offers is an attempt to reduce vibration, as is the use of Stockbridge dampers on the cables. The deck is an orthotropic steel box girder of aerofoil shape with cantilevered cycle tracks and footway supported from the box. The shape of the bridge was determined by the designers Freeman, Fox and Partners following wind tunnel tests for the Forth Road Bridge, after the original wind tunnel model was accidentally destroyed. The sections of the deck were built at Fairfield-Mabey in Chepstow, and each 132 tonne section was then floated down the river before being hoisted into position.

Beachley Viaduct 

The  Beachley Viaduct is of a box girder construction similar to that of the Severn Bridge but is supported on steel trestles as it crosses the Beachley peninsula over the British Army camp, Beachley Barracks, that is home to 1st Battalion, The Rifles. In November 2016 the Ministry of Defence announced that the site would close in 2027.

Wye Bridge 

It consists of a single large cable stayed section with two single-leg pylons supporting the bridge deck from the centre of the roadway. The deck is an orthotropic box girder similar to the Severn Bridge but has a different appearance as it has two sets of cable stays on each of two towers. Originally there was only one set of cable stays but these were replaced during the strengthening works. The Wye Bridge was built by Cleveland Bridge & Engineering Company.

Tolls 
The toll was collected on the English side, but only for vehicles travelling westwards from England to Wales. This led some people to describe it as a "tax on entering Wales", both in jest and also as a more serious anti-toll campaign.
Originally, tolls were charged in both directions, but the arrangements were changed in the early 1990s to eliminate the need for a set of toll booths for each direction of travel and the potential for traffic waiting to pay the toll backing up onto the bridge itself.

Shortly after the opening of the Severn Bridge, Welsh poet Harri Webb wrote an Ode on the Severn Bridge:

In 1966, the toll for using the new motorway crossing was set at 2s 6d (post-decimalisation equivalent £0.125) for all vehicles apart from solo motorcycles which enjoyed a reduced toll of 1s (£0.05). For a small car the bridge toll represented a saving of 7s (£0.35) on the price of the ferry crossing, at that time 9s 6d (£0.475). If the Severn toll had increased in line with general inflation since September 1966, when Queen Elizabeth II opened the bridge, the original value of £0.125 would have reached £2.19 in each direction (or £4.38 as it is just a one-way toll) .

In the 2016 United Kingdom budget George Osborne, the Chancellor of the Exchequer, announced that toll charges on the Severn crossings would be halved in 2018. The Welsh Liberal Democrats leader Kirsty Williams called the cut "pathetic" and said, "The Chancellor is cynically acting as if he is doing commuters a favour, but the fact is that he wants to keep this unfair tax on entering Wales." The toll was due to be cut to £5.40 in 2017 but actually increased further.

In July 2017, the Welsh Secretary, Alun Cairns, announced that tolls would be abolished by the end of 2018, claiming that this would boost the South Wales economy by around £100m a year. In September 2017, Cairns confirmed that tolls would be reduced in January 2018 when VAT is removed. In October 2018 he said that the Severn Bridge tolls would cease on 17 December 2018.
 
On 17 December 2018, all toll lanes were permanently closed, officially marking the start of a toll-free journey into Wales for the first time since the bridge's construction. During the removal process of the toll booths, traffic was directed through a temporary three-lane layout, directly through the centre of the former toll lanes. These lanes were narrower than usual, resulting in a 50 mph speed limit being enforced. On 25 March 2019, a newly resurfaced road structure was opened, moving traffic flow from the centre of the former toll lanes to the right-hand side, directly next to eastbound traffic. This will allow for further work to remove any remaining toll infrastructure to the left of the new road layout.

History of charges

Category 1: passenger vehicles up to 9 seats
Category 2: commercial vehicles up to 3,500 kg and buses up to 17 seats
Category 3: commercial vehicles over 3,500 kg

Ownership 
Ownership and operation of the bridge passed to Severn River Crossing plc on 26 April 1992 as part of the deal to build the Second Severn Crossing.

 35% John Laing, British developer infrastructure operator
 35% Vinci, French concessions and construction company
 15% Bank of America, American multinational banking and financial services corporation
 15% Barclays Capital, British multinational investment bank

The company's 2011 annual report showed the same companies still owned, through subsidiary companies, all the issued ordinary share capital of the Plc.

Ownership of the bridge and the Second Severn Crossing returned to the UK government on 8 January 2018 when the revenue required to build and maintain them, as defined in a Concession Agreement with the Secretary of State for Transport, had been collected. In 2010, the concession was expected to end in 2017. In 2012, changes were made to the agreement to reflect the effect of changes in VAT and Corporation Tax and the costs of installing credit card handling systems. The net effect was to increase the required revenue from £995.83 million to £1,028.91 million in 1989 prices.

Monuments and plaques

Bridge status 
On 6 February 2009, during a week of snowfall throughout Britain, both Severn bridges were closed simultaneously due to ice falling from the bridge structure and damaging vehicles. On 22 December 2009, both bridges were closed again for the same reason.

A privately developed app called Enviroute provides the status of both bridges. The original Severn Bridge status website, www.severnbridge.co.uk, was decommissioned in December 2018 following the removal of the tolls and the handing back of the first bridge to the UK government.

See also
 List of crossings of the River Severn
 List of crossings of the River Wye
 Aust Severn Powerline Crossing

References

External links

 
 Bridge celebrates 40th birthday (video), BBC News, 8 September 2006
 Archive pictures of the bridge being built (BBC)
 Video of the Queen opening the bridge in 1966 (BBC)
 Motorway Database: M48

Bridges across the River Severn
Bridges across the River Wye
Bridges completed in 1966
Bridges in Monmouthshire
Bridges in South Gloucestershire District
Chepstow
Grade I listed bridges
Grade I listed buildings in Gloucestershire
Grade II listed buildings in Gloucestershire
Grade II listed buildings in Monmouthshire
Landmarks in Wales
M4 motorway
Motorway bridges in England
Motorway bridges in Wales
Recipients of Civic Trust Awards
Suspension bridges in the United Kingdom
Former toll bridges in Wales
Former toll bridges in England